Stephen John Bachop (born 2 April 1966 in Christchurch) is a former New Zealand rugby union player and current coach. He is the older brother of fellow former All Black, Graeme Bachop.

Rugby career
Bachop had two spells in the National Provincial Championship with each Canterbury and Otago, and also played for the Highlanders in the first Super 12 season in 1996. He then moved north in 1997 and for the next two seasons played with the Central Vikings in the NPC second division and for the Hurricanes in the Super 12.

Bachop had a key role in Otago's back to back wins over the British and Irish Lions in 1993 and the Springboks in 1994.

Bachop is of Samoan, Tahitian and Cook Islands Heritage.

Family
Several of Bachop's relatives have played sport at a high level, among them brother Graeme Bachop and nephews Aaron Mauger and Nathan Mauger, all of whom have played for the All Blacks. Stephen's wife was Sue Garden-Bachop, a New Zealand representative and coach at women's rugby. Their son, Jackson Garden-Bachop, is also a professional rugby player, and their daughter Georgia Garden-Bachop has represented New Zealand at age-group level at hockey. Another uncle of Aaron and Nathan is former world speedway champion Ivan Mauger.

All Blacks statistics
Tests: 5 (0 as Captain)
Games: 13 (0 as Captain)
Total Matches: 18 (0 as Captain)
Test Points: 0pts
Game Points: 33pts (6t, 0c, 0p, 1dg, 0m)
Total Points: 33pts (6t, 0c, 0p, 1dg, 0m)

References

External links

1966 births
New Zealand rugby union coaches
New Zealand rugby union players
New Zealand sportspeople of Cook Island descent
New Zealand people of French Polynesian descent
New Zealand sportspeople of Samoan descent
Samoa international rugby union players
New Zealand international rugby union players
Otago rugby union players
Leeds Tykes players
London Irish players
Blackrock College RFC players
Rugby union fly-halves
Rugby union players from Christchurch
Living people
Bachop-Mauger family